
Gmina Brodnica is a rural gmina (administrative district) in Śrem County, Greater Poland Voivodeship, in west-central Poland.

Villages
Gmina Brodnica contains the villages and settlements of Boreczek, Brodnica, Brodniczka, Chaławy, Esterpole, Górka, Grabianowo, Grzybno, Iłówiec, Iłówiec Wielki, Jaszkowo, Kopyta, Ludwikowo, Manieczki, Ogieniowo, Piotrowo, Przylepki, Rogaczewo, Sucharzewo, Sulejewo, Szołdry, Tworzykowo, Żabno and Żurawiec.

Neighbouring gminas
Gmina Brodnica is bordered by the gminas of Czempiń, Mosina and Śrem.

References
Polish official population figures 2006

Brodnica
Gmina Brodnica